Bilateral relations exist between the Republic of Azerbaijan and the Republic of Burkina Faso in the diplomatic, cultural, socio-economic and other spheres. Neither country has a resident ambassador. Burkina Faso has a non resident embassy in Ankara.

Diplomatic relations 
Diplomatic relations between the Republic of Azerbaijan and the Republic of Burkina Faso were established for the first time on May 31, 2004.

Earlier, on May 28, 2004, the governments of two countries signed a Protocol on the establishment of diplomatic relations.

Economic cooperation 
Burkina Faso's main export to Azerbaijan is energy.

There is a cooperation in the energy sector.

According to United Nations statistics, Azerbaijan's exports to Burkina Faso in 2018 amounted to 51,744 US dollars.

According to United Nations statistics, Burkina Faso's exports to Azerbaijan in 2019 amounted to 3,644 US dollars.

International cooperation 
Cooperation between Azerbaijan and Burkina Faso in the international arena is carried out within the framework of various organizations: the Organization of Islamic Cooperation, UNESCO, and the African Union.

Humanitarian assistance 
In 2011–2012, the Azerbaijan International Development Agency (AIDA) provided financial assistance to Burkina Faso in the amount of 50 thousand US dollars to overcome the food crisis.

Joint projects 
On December 3–8, 2012, within the framework of an equal partnership between the Azerbaijan International Development Agency (AIDA) and the Islamic development Bank jointly launched the campaign “preventing avoidable blindness” in the capital of Burkina Faso, Ouagadougou. During the campaign, local residents underwent cataract surgery. In addition, there was a training provided for five ophthalmologists from Burkina Faso. A similar campaign was launched again in May 2013. 

There are a number of regional and international projects implemented with the participation of SOCAR.

In 2016, there were several commercial agreements signed between the State oil company of Azerbaijan SOCAR Trading and the oil company of Burkina Faso SONABHY for the supply of petroleum products to Burkina Faso.

See also  
 Foreign relations of Azerbaijan
 Foreign relations of Burkina Faso

References 

 

 
Burkina Faso
Azerbaijan